The non-marine molluscs of Seychelles are a part of the molluscan wildlife of Seychelles.

Freshwater gastropods 

Paludomidae
 Paludomus ajanensis Morelet, 1860

Land gastropods 

Streptaxidae - There are 20 species of Streptaxidae on the Seychelles. Seven genera of Streptaxidae are endemic to the Seychelles: Stereostele, Imperturbatia, Silhouettia, Careoradula, Augustula, Priodiscus and Acanthennea.

 Acanthennea erinacea (Martens, 1898) - endemic
 Augustula braueri (Martens, 1898) - endemic
 Careoradula perelegans (Martens, 1898) - endemic
 Conturbatia crenata Gerlach, 2001 - endemic to Frégate Island, possibly extinct
 Edentulina dussumieri (Dufo, 1840) - subspecies: Edentulina dussumieri dussumieri (Dufo, 1840); Edentulina dussumieri reservae Gerlach & Bruggen, 1999; Edentulina dussumieri silhouettae Gerlach & Bruggen, 1999; Edentulina dussumieri praslina Gerlach & Bruggen, 1999. The subspecies praslina is only known as subfossil.
 Edentulina moreleti (Adams, 1868) - endemic
 Glabrennea gardineri (Sykes, 1909) - endemic
 Glabrennea silhouettensis (Verdcourt, 1994) - endemic
 Glabrennea thomasseti (Sykes, 1909) - endemic
 Gonaxis quadrilateralis Preston, 1910 / Gonaxis (Macrogonaxis) quadrilateralis (Preston, 1910) / Macrogonaxis quadrilateralis - introduced in 1958 to biological control two species of Achatina, but it has failed
 Huttonella bicolor (Hutton, 1834)
 Imperturbatia constans (Martens, 1898) - endemic
 Imperturbatia violescens (Martens, 1898) - endemic - Gerlach & Bruggen (1999) have spelled the specific name as Imperturbatia violascens
 Priodiscus costatus - endemic
 Priodiscus serratus (Adams, 1868) - endemic
 Priodiscus spinatus - endemic
 Seychellaxis souleyetianus (Petit, 1841) - endemic
 Silhouettia silhouettae (Martens, 1898) - endemic
 Stereostele nevilli (Adams, 1868) - endemic - subspecies: Stereostele nevilli nevilli (Adams, 1868) and Stereostele nevilli parvidentata Gerlach & Bruggen, 1999
 Streptostele acicula (Morelet, 1877)

See also
 List of marine molluscs of Seychelles
 List of non-marine molluscs of Zanzibar
 List of non-marine molluscs of Mauritius
 List of non-marine molluscs of Réunion
 List of non-marine molluscs of Comoros
 List of non-marine molluscs of Mayotte
 List of non-marine molluscs of Madagascar

References

Further reading 
 Gerlach J. (1998). "The shell-less slugs of Seychelles (Gastropoda, Pulmonata, Veronicellidae and Urocyclidae)". Argonauta 11: 56–64.
 Gerlach J. (2007) Terrestrial and Freshwater Mollusca of Seychelles. Backhuys Publishers, Leiden.
 Martens E. & Wiegmann F. (1898). "Land und Süsswasser mollusken der Seychellen". Mitteilugen aus dem Zoologischen, Sammlung des Museums Naturkunde, Berlin 1: 1-94.

External links
 Biodiversity of the Seychelles islands

Moluscs
Seychelles
Seychelles